These Glamour Girls is a 1939 comedy-drama film directed by S. Sylvan Simon and starring Lew Ayres and Lana Turner, with Tom Brown, Jane Bryan, Richard Carlson, Anita Louise and Ann Rutherford in featured roles.

Plot summary
A drunken college student invites a dance hostess to the big college dance and then forgets he asked her. When she shows up at school, he tries to get rid of her, but she won't leave. Instead she stays and shows up both him and his classmates' snooty dates.

Cast
 Lew Ayres as Philip S. 'Phil' Griswold III
 Lana Turner as Jane Thomas
 Tom Brown as Homer Ten Eyck
 Richard Carlson as Joe
 Jane Bryan as Carol Christy
 Anita Louise as Daphne 'Daph' Graves
 Marsha Hunt as Betty Ainsbridge
 Ann Rutherford as Mary Rose Wilston
 Mary Beth Hughes as Ann Van Reichton
 Owen Davis Jr. as Greg Smith
 Ernest Truex as Alumnus of Harvard
 Sumner Getchell as Blimpy
 Peter Lind Hayes as Skel Lorimer (as Peter Hayes)
 Don Castle as Jack
 Tom Collins as Tommy Torgler

Reception
According to MGM records the film earned $420,000 in the US and Canada and $160,000 elsewhere resulting in a loss of $33,000.

References

External links
 
 
 
 

1939 films
1930s romantic comedy-drama films
American black-and-white films
American romantic comedy-drama films
1930s English-language films
Films directed by S. Sylvan Simon
Films set in universities and colleges
Metro-Goldwyn-Mayer films
1939 comedy films
1939 drama films
Films scored by Edward Ward (composer)
1930s American films